Joseph Odidi Itotoh (18 May 1941 – 27 September 2006) was a Nigerian trade union leader and politician.

Born in Uromi, Itotoh attended the Salvation Army School, then the Central Catholic School in Zaria, and the Annunciation Catholic College in Irrua.  He became a schoolteacher, working first at the Pilgrim Baptist Grammar School in Ewohimi, then as principal at the Edo National College in Iguobazuwa, followed by a stint at the Immaculate Conception College in Benin City.  From 1978 to 1981, he studied at the University of Ibadan, from which he received a doctorate.

Itotoh joined the Nigeria Union of Teachers, and served as its president from 1980 until 1986, and from 1981 also as president of the All-Africa Teachers' Organisation.  In 1986, he became president of the World Confederation of Organisations of the Teaching Profession.

Itotoh served on the Teaching Service Commission in Bendel State, then the Committee for Education in Edo State.  He was appointed Edo State Commissioner for Education between 1992 and 1995. In 2005, he was appointed as Minister of State for Internal Affairs.  He became seriously ill in February 2006 and flew abroad for treatment.  He returned to Nigeria in September and died shortly afterwards.

References

1941 births
2006 deaths
Nigerian politicians
Nigerian trade unionists
People from Edo State
University of Ibadan alumni